The 2005 Begumpet suicide bombing resulted in the deaths of two persons at the Hyderabad City Police Commissioner's Task Force office at Begumpet. On 12 October 2005, at around 7.30 PM IST, a suicide bomber detonated explosives outside the Task Force office killing himself and 45-year-old home guard A. Satyanarayana.

The suicide bomber was reported to be a Bangladeshi national Dalin alias Mohtasim Billal, member of Harkat-ul-Jihad al-Islami (HuJI), a banned Islamic terror group.

Ghulam Yazdani and Shahed Bilal key accused in the bombing died on 8 March 2006 and 30 August 2007 respectively. The bombing was reported to be carried out to avenge the killing of Mujahid Salim, son of SIMI patron Maulana Abdul Aleem Islahi, by Gujarat police in 2004.

See also
Darsgah-Jihad-O-Shahadat

References

21st-century mass murder in India
History of Hyderabad, India
Suicide bombings in India
Islamic terrorist incidents in 2005
Terrorist incidents in India in 2005
Crime in Hyderabad, India